Vivantia is a genus of fungi in the family Xylariaceae.  A monotypic genus, it contains the single species V. guadalupensis, described in 1996.

References

External links
Index Fungorum

Xylariales
Monotypic Ascomycota genera
Taxa described in 1996